Trymaine D. Lee (born September 20, 1978) is an American journalist. He shared a Pulitzer Prize for breaking news coverage of Hurricane Katrina as part of a team at The Times-Picayune of New Orleans. From 2006 to 2010, Lee wrote for The New York Times and from early 2011 to November 2012 he was a senior reporter at The Huffington Post. Since then Lee has been a national reporter for MSNBC, where he writes for the network's digital arm, and hosts the podcast Into America.

Background
Lee was raised in Chesilhurst, New Jersey. As a child, he showed an early interest in writing and athletics while attending the Milton Hershey School in Hershey, Pennsylvania. After obtaining an associate degree in communications studies at Camden County College, he earned a Bachelor of Arts in Journalism from Rowan University.  While at Rowan, he wrote for the school newspaper The Whit and was involved with the NAACP.

Career
Lee began his career reporting on police and crime at the Philadelphia Tribune and the Trentonian of Trenton, New Jersey. Outside of his work as a daily reporter, his work has also appeared in the magazines Ebony, Essence, Real Health and The Crisis.

Times-Picayune and Hurricane Katrina
As a reporter for The Times-Picayune, Lee covered Hurricane Katrina as it happened. He had arrived in New Orleans only four months before. Lee says that he was given the opportunity to evacuate on August 29 by another editor, but chose to stay and cover the story. His article "Nightmare in the 9th Ward all too real for one woman" was published on September 1, 2005—exclusively online because the newspaper could not be printed.

The New York Times
From 2006 to 2010, Lee was a staff reporter for The New York Times, where he primarily covered Harlem. During this period, Lee also reported from Albany and Brooklyn and contributed to a series of videos called "New York On Less".

The Huffington Post
In March 2011, Lee was hired to cover "national issues that impact the black community" for Huffington Post's Black Voices. The move was a consequence of AOL's acquisition and expansion of Huffington.

Reporting on Trayvon Martin
Lee did not learn of Trayvon Martin until more than a week after the teenager's death, but he was one of the first national reporters to cover the story, for Huffington Post's Black Voices on March 8, 2012. He continued filing stories on the case nearly every day that month. He believes that his "early coverage definitely helped light the fire ... Before we pushed the story, few if any major national news outlets were covering it." Lee appeared on Countdown with Keith Olbermann to discuss the story multiple times.

MSNBC
In November 2012, Lee joined MSNBC as a national reporter for its digital unit, reporting on social justice issues and the impact of politics and policy on everyday people. Lee described his move to MSNBC as a chance to "flex different muscles" as a journalist.

In February 2020, Lee began hosting the MSNBC podcast Into America.

Awards

Pulitzer Prize
"Nightmare in the 9th Ward all too real for one woman" was one of the ten stories cited when The Times-Picayune staff won the Pulitzer Prize for Breaking News Reporting in 2006. Lee shared the award with three other reporters, Doug MacCash, Manuel Torres, and Mark Schleifstein. The award marked the first time a Pulitzer was awarded for online journalism. Lee also contributed to coverage of the Eliot Spitzer prostitution scandal by The New York Times, which won the Breaking News Pulitzer three years later.

Other awards
In 2006, Lee was named Emerging Journalist of the Year (one of three) by the National Association of Black Journalists. The New York chapter of the association gave him the Griot award in 2011. In April 2012, Lee won the April Sidney Award from the Sidney Hillman Foundation for his coverage of the Trayvon Martin case. His alma maters Rowan University and Camden County College have both recognized him as outstanding among their alumni. In 2021, Lee won "Podcast Host of the Year" at the Adweek Podcast Awards.

References

External links

1978 births
Living people
African-American journalists
Pulitzer Prize for Breaking News Reporting winners
The New York Times people
African-American non-fiction writers
American non-fiction writers
Place of birth missing (living people)
MSNBC people
Rowan University alumni
American male journalists
21st-century American journalists
People from Camden County, New Jersey
Journalists from New Jersey
Milton Hershey School alumni